Roadworms: The Berlin Sessions is an album by American art rock band the Residents, released in 2000. During the tour supporting the Wormwood album, many of the songs changed quite a bit. Roadworms is an attempt to capture, live in the studio, the way the music was being played in concert. For those wanting to hear the concert versions, a limited edition double CD entitled Wormwood Live was released in 1999.

CD Track listing
 "Un-American Band" – 2:59
 "How to Get a Head. Road" – 5:20
 "Hanging by His Hair. Road" – 3:28
 "God's Magic Finger. Road" – 3:20
 "Tent Peg in the Temple. Road" – 4:09
 "Fire Fall. Road" – 5:34
 "Cain and Abel. Road" – 4:15
 "Dinah and the Unclean Skin. Road" – 4:04
 "Abraham. Road" – 6:44
 "Burn Baby, Burn. Road" – 3:42
 "Judas Saves. Road" – 8:46

Personnel
Mr. Skull – vocals
Molly Harvey – vocals
The Residents - percussion, guitar, keyboards, treated vocals, bass
Tony Janssen – engineer
Euro Ralph – producer
Cryptic Corporation – producer

The Residents albums
2000 albums